The Reverend Fred Pratt Green MBE (2 September 1903 – 22 October 2000) was a British Methodist minister and hymnodist.

Born in Roby, Lancashire, England, he began his ministry in the Filey circuit. He was ordained as a Methodist minister in 1928 and served circuits in the north and south of England until 1969. During his career as a minister he wrote numerous plays and hymns. It was not until he retired, however, that he began writing prolifically.

His hymns reflect his rejection of fundamentalism and show his concern with social issues. They include many that were written to supply obvious liturgical needs of the modern church, speaking to topics or appropriate for events for which there were few traditional hymns available. Green also wrote poetry: his poem The Old Couple was included by Philip Larkin in 'The Oxford Book of Twentieth-Century English Verse' (1973). He died on 22 October 2000. His obituary in The Times of 24 October 2000 quoted him as saying of hymn singing, 
"It’s such a dangerous activity … you get this glow which you can mistake for religious experience".

His hymns appear in hymn books of various denominations, but most notably in Singing the Faith, the hymn book of the Methodist Church of Great Britain, and the United Methodist Hymnal used in the United States.

Hymnal indexes vary in alphabetizing him under 'G' or 'P'.

As well as writing his own hymns, Green produced translations, notably translating one of Dietrich Bonhoeffer's late poems as the hymn, "By gracious powers so wonderfully sheltered".

The Pratt Green Trust was set up from the royalties from his hymns. His scrapbooks and hymnbook collections are now held in the Pratt Green Collection at Durham University.

The collection of related materials at the Pitts Theology Library at Emory University, Atlanta, consists of 51 scrapbooks maintained by Fred Pratt Green from approximately 1971 until he ceased writing hymns in 1988. Green compiled an index to his scrapbooks which includes an index to the first line of each hymn, references to pieces in Hymns and Ballads by Fred Pratt Green, color-coded references to published works and translations, and information on how a hymn was used. The scrapbooks contain drafts of hymns, photographs, correspondence, bulletins and programs from services that used his hymns, announcements, newspaper and journal clippings, and handwritten notations by Green describing when a hymn was written and reprinted and why and for whom the piece was written.

List of hymns (partial) 
 A Carol for Easter Eve
 A Carol for Mothering Sunday 
 An upper room did our Lord prepare
 Christ is the world's light
 For the Fruits of his Creation
 God in his love for us lent us this planet
 God is here! As we his people meet to offer praise and prayer
 How Blest Are They Who Trust in Christ
 How clear is our vocation, Lord
 In that Land which we call Holy
 It is God who holds the nations in the hollow of his hand
 Let Us Praise Creation's Lord 
 Long ago prophets knew Christ would come, born a Jew 
 Lord Let Us Listen When You Speak
 Lord we have come at your own invitation
 Now Praise the Hidden Love of God
 O Christ, the Healer
 Of All the Spirit's Gifts to Me
 Rejoice in God's Saints
 Seek the Lord
 The church of Christ, in every age
 There is a Love
 This joyful Eastertide, what need is there (not to be confused with This joyful Eastertide by George Ratcliffe Woodward)
 This Is The Threefold Truth
 To Mock Your Reign, O Dearest Lord
 When in Our Music God Is Glorified
 When Jesus Came to Jordan
 When Our Confidence Is Shaken
 When the Church of Jesus
 Whom Shall I Send?
 You Dear Lord Resplendent Within Our Darkness 
 Yours Be the Glory

Publications 
 The Hymns of Fred Pratt Green, Braley The Expository Times.2003; 114: 409-412 
 The Hymns and Ballads of Fred Pratt Green. Stainer & Bell
Later Hymns and Ballads and Fifty Poems. Stainer & Bell/Hope
The Old Couple. Poems. Stockport, Peterloo Poets, 1976
The Last Lap. A Sequence of Verse on the Theme of Old Age. London, Stainer & Bell Ltd and Carol Stream, Hope Publishing Company, 1991.

Sources 
 Pitts Theology Library

Notes

External links 
 Stainer and Bell biography
 Pratt Green Trust
Fred Pratt Green papers, circa 1928-1988 at Pitts Theology Library, Candler School of Theology
Pratt Green Collection at Palace Green Library, University of Durham

1903 births
2000 deaths
People from Roby
English Methodist ministers
20th-century Methodist ministers
English Methodist hymnwriters
Commanders of the Order of the British Empire
Clergy from Merseyside